An exchange of futures for swaps (EFS) is a transaction negotiated privately in which a futures contract for a physical item is exchanged for a cash settled swap contract. It is similar to an EFP except that it involves a cash contract rather than a physicals contract. An EFS gives the market participants a chance to liquidate a swap position in an environment that is normally not very liquid.

References

Futures markets
Derivatives (finance)
Swaps (finance)